Edessa florida is a species of stink bug in the family Pentatomidae. It is found in North America.

References

Pentatomidae
Articles created by Qbugbot
Insects described in 1935